Hans Roedder (March 12, 1879 – December 9, 1966) was an American sport shooter who competed in the 1912 Summer Olympics. In 1912 he finished tenth in the 30 metre rapid fire pistol competition and 22nd in the 50 metre pistol event.

References

External links
List of American sport shooters

1879 births
1966 deaths
American male sport shooters
ISSF pistol shooters
Olympic shooters of the United States
Shooters at the 1912 Summer Olympics
Emigrants from the German Empire to the United States